Luis Fortuño Janeiro (1902 – 1966) was a politician, historian, journalist, and businessman from Ponce, Puerto Rico. He was senator from Ponce from 1937 to 1941.

Historian and journalist
Fortuño is best remembered for his Album Histórico de Ponce (1692–1963), a photographic record of the city of Ponce and its leaders that covered nearly 300 years of Ponce history. It was his second edition of the book. He owned Imprenta Fortuño (Fortuño Press), a 20th-century icon in southern Puerto Rico's publishing industry. The press shut down in 2015.

Political career
In 1936, he led the strike against the high rates of the Ponce Electric Company. The Company was subsequently sold to the Puerto Rican Government's Autoridad de Fuentes Fluviales (now (2019) called "Autoridad de Energía Eléctrica de Puerto Rico"), becoming part of it in 1937. In 1956 Fortuño ran for mayor of Ponce, but lost his bid to Carlos Juan Cintrón.

Books by Fortuño Janeiro
Album histórico de Ponce, 1692–1963 Ponce, PR: Imprenta Fortuño. 1937. (First edition)
Laureles póstumos : Antonio R. Barceló. 1939. (co-authored with Ramón Fortuño Sellés)
Album histórico de Ponce, 1692–1963 Ponce, PR: Imprenta Fortuño. 1963. (Second Edition)

Note: Fay Fowlie-Flores wrote an index to both editions of the Album Histórico tilted "Indice a las dos ediciones del Album histórico de Ponce : 1692–1963."

Accolades
 He is recognized at the Parque del Tricentenario in Ponce, Puerto Rico.
 In 1973, the Municipality of Ponce dedicated its Ponce Carnaval to him.

Death
Fortuño Janeiro died in the hospital in Cuarto, Ponce, Puerto Rico, on 19 June 1966 due to late stage stomach cancer.

References

Journalists from Ponce
Members of the Senate of Puerto Rico
Politicians from Ponce
Writers from Ponce
20th-century Puerto Rican historians
Businesspeople from Ponce
Year of birth uncertain
1902 births
1966 deaths
Historians of Puerto Rico